Peter Mata'utia-Leifi (born ), also known by the nickname of "Peanut", is a Samoa international rugby league footballer who plays as a  or  for the Warrington Wolves in the Betfred Super League. 

He has previously played for the Newcastle Knights, in two spells, and the St. George Illawarra Dragons in the NRL. Mata'utia has also played for the Leigh Centurions in the Championship and on loan from Leigh at Castleford (Heritage № 986) in the Super League. Mata'utia is signed to Warrington Wolves for the 2022 Superleague season.

Background
Mata'utia was born in Bankstown, New South Wales, Australia and is of Samoan descent.

He played his junior rugby league for the Bankstown Cougars. He then moved to Newcastle, New South Wales, and played for Raymond Terrace, before being signed by the Newcastle Knights.

Mata'utia is the older brother of Knights teammates Chanel Mata'utia, Pat Mata'utia and Sione Mata'utia.

Playing career

Early career
From 2008 to 2010, Mata'utia played for the Newcastle Knights' NYC team, scoring over 300 points in 44 games. In August 2008, he played for the Australian Schoolboys. On 17 October 2009, he played for Samoa against the Cook Islands in the 2009 Pacific Cup.

2011
In 2011, Mata'utia graduated to the Knights' New South Wales Cup team, Central Coast Centurions. In Round 11 of the 2011 NRL season, he made his NRL debut for the Knights against the Sydney Roosters, scoring a try on debut. On 17 June, he re-signed with the Knights on a 2-year contract, turning down offers from three rival teams. He finished his debut season having played in five games and scoring two tries.

2012

In July, Mata'utia was admitted to hospital after suffering a crushed larynx in a New South Wales Cup game for the Knights. He received an emergency tracheostomy after he was unable to breathe during a scan on his neck. He was ruled out for the rest of the season, after only playing one NRL game for the Knights that year.

2013
On 17 July, Mata'utia played for the New South Wales Residents against the Queensland Residents. On 23 August, he signed a 2-year contract with the St. George Illawarra Dragons starting in 2014, after failing to break into the Knights' first-grade team in 2013. On 22 September, he was named at centre in the 2013 New South Wales Cup Team of the Year.

2014
On 3 May, Mata'utia returned to the Samoan side against Fiji in the 2014 Pacific Rugby League International. In Round 10 of the 2014 NRL season, he made his club debut for the Dragons against the Parramatta Eels. On 8 September, he was named in the Samoan train-on squad for the 2014 Four Nations, later making the final 24-man squad for Samoa, however he was unable to compete in the tournament due to passport issues.

2015

On 3 May, Mata'utia again played for the New South Wales Residents against the Queensland Residents, this time alongside his brother Chanel. On 24 June, he re-signed with the Dragons on a 2-year contract.

2016
On 20 April, Mata'utia returned to the Newcastle Knights effective immediately on a contract until the end of 2017, after being released from his Dragons contract.

2017
Mata'utia played in every match for the Knights in the 2017 season, only missing 6 games since returning to the Knights midway through the 2016 season. In October, he rejected a 1-year extension offer from the Knights and instead signed a 3-year contract with the Leigh Centurions in the English Kingstone Press Championship.

2018
Mata'utia started the 2018 season with the Leigh Centurions, however, was allowed to leave the club due to the club's inability to make the top 4 of the Championship and owner Derek Beaumont admitting that he would not be able to financially support the club beyond the current season. Mata'utia signed a loan deal with Castleford Tigers until the end of 2018, which would lead to a 3-year deal from 2019 until the end of 2021. He made his debut in the Tigers' 52-24 victory over Widnes Vikings.

2019
Mata'utia was assigned the number 1 jersey. In January 2019 he revealed tha this five-year old son had suffered a cancer scare.

2021
On 25 June 2021 he played for the Combined Nations All Stars, and scored a try, in their 26-24 victory over England, staged at the Halliwell Jones Stadium, Warrington, as part of England’s 2021 Rugby League World Cup preparation.

On 17 July, he played for Castleford in their 2021 Challenge Cup Final loss against St. Helens.

References

External links
Castleford Tigers profile
Leigh Centurions profile
Newcastle Knights profile
2017 RLWC profile
SL profile

1990 births
Living people
Australian sportspeople of Samoan descent
Australian rugby league players
Castleford Tigers players
Central Coast Centurions players
Combined Nationalities rugby league team players
Illawarra Cutters players
Leigh Leopards players
Mata'utia family (rugby)
Newcastle Knights players
Rugby league centres
Rugby league fullbacks
Rugby league players from Sydney
Rugby league wingers
Samoa national rugby league team players
Samoan sportspeople
St. George Illawarra Dragons players
Warrington Wolves players